The Renault AGx was a range of light/medium/heavy trucks produced by the French manufacturer Renault between 1937 and 1941. The range includes both conventional (AGC, AGT) and forward control (AGK, AGP, AGR, AGOD, AGLD) trucks.

History and technical details

AGS

The AGS was a commercial and military version of the Renault Primaquatre with a payload of 0.4 tonnes.

AGC

The Renault AGC is a conventional cabin light truck with a 1.5 tonnes payload produced between 1938 and 1940. It replaced the Renault ADK. The gearbox was a 4-speed manual unit. Besides a simple truck, the AGC was produced as a van and as a bus for 12 to 14 passengers.

AGT
The Renault AGT is a conventional cabin light truck with a 2.5 tonnes payload produced between 1937 and 1940. It replaced the long version of the Renault ADH. For military use, it was delivered with a  wheelbase (which was common to all versions), a  length and a  width. The truck has a 4-speed manual gearbox.

AGP
The Renault AGP is a forward control light truck with a payload between 2.5 and 3 tonnes. The engines are a 4-litre inline-four petrol unit and a 4.7-litre inline-four diesel, the AGPs using the latter are known as AGPD. The truck has a 4-speed manual gearbox.

In 1937, the Société Algérienne des Transports Tropicaux (SATT) commissioned a new AGP-based coach for its trans-Saharan passenger service to replace the heavier Renaults AKGD it was using before. The coach design was led by SATT's chief Georges Estienne who also had designed a previous coach based on the six-wheeler Renault OX. It used an  petrol engine and included 7 seats for passengers.

The AGP only had a limited military use. AGPD units were commissioned by the Chinese military.

AGR
The forward control Renault AGR, produced between 1937 and 1941, is a medium truck with a payload of 3.5 tonnes. For military use, it was delivered in various versions: the most produced has a  wheelbase (which was common to all versions), a  length and a  width. The truck also has a gasifier-equipped version. The gearbox is a 4-speed manual unit.

AGK

The forward control Renault AGK, introduced at the end of 1937 and produced until 1940, replaced the 1935 Renault ABF (one of the first forward control produced by the company). It has a payload between 5 and 6.5 tonnes. For military use, it was delivered in various versions:  the most produced has a  wheelbase (which was common to all versions), a  length and a  width. The "all purposes" TTN 30-31 version has a  length and a  width, the TTN 39 has a  length. The tanker version has a  length and a  width. The "mobile workshop" version has a  length and a  width.

For commercial use, the AGK was available with four configurations: van, flatbed, tipper, and cabin only.

All AGK versions use a 5.9-litre inline-four petrol engine delivering  ( for the civilian version) at 2,000 rpm. The diesel version (AGKD) has an 8.4-litre inline-four engine. The truck has a 4-speed manual gearbox.

By 1937, the ZP bus/coach adopted the AGK cabin.

Heavier models
The Renaults AGLD and AGOD are heavy trucks. The AGOD was produced between 1937 and 1939 with a payload of 8 tonnes. It has a 5-speed manual gearbox. The AGOD was used by the Compagnie Générale Transsharienne (CGT) as a truck as well as with a coach bodywork for its trans-Saharan transport service.

Other Renault heavy vehicles using the 12.5-litre engine
At the 1936 Paris Salon, Renault unveiled various forward-control vehicles for 1937 powered by the 12.5-litre diesel engine and with 5-speed gearboxes: the ADS, the ADT, the AFKD, and the AEMD.

The AFKD is a six-wheeler truck with a payload of 10 tonnes and servomechanical/air brakes. It was replaced in 1939 by the similarly looking Renault AIB, with air brakes and powered by a 5.9-litre engine delivering . The AEMD is a coach/bus of up to 43 places. AEMD sales were postponed until November 1937 and by that time it replaced the engine with a 15.7-litre straight-six diesel delivering . For 1939, the AEMD increased its capacity to up to 51 passengers. It was put out of sale later that year.

References

Citations

Bibliography

Cab over vehicles
Vehicles introduced in 1937
AGx